Stray Dogs is a horror comic written by Tony Fleecs with art by Trish Forstner, told from the viewpoint of dogs. It was first published by Image Comics as 5 individual issues in 2021; a trade paperback was published in 2021.

Reception
Library Journal called it a "strange and terrible tale made creepier by the cuteness of its characters", with "fine craftmanship" and a "fresh plot", but emphasizing that it is for "adult readers" despite the dogs being "almost cartoon-like, looking like they could come from a children’s show".

Comic Book Resources praised it as "a well-plotted anxiety-inducing thriller", lauding Fleecs for "giv[ing] each dog a distinct personality [so that] each member of the large cast [can] play their own distinct role in the narrative", and compared Forstner's "cute, emotive [art] style" to Lady and the Tramp, while commending her depictions of violence.

Adaptation
In 2020, before the first issue of Stray Dogs went on sale, Paramount Animation purchased the rights to adapt it into a film, with Gary Dauberman as producer.

Sales
Orders for Stray Dogs were high enough that issue #1 was reprinted four times, for a total of over 100,000 copies.

References

Horror comics
Image Comics titles